Kpomassè  is a town, arrondissement, and commune in the Atlantique Department of southern Benin. The commune covers an area of 305 square kilometres and as of 2002 had a population of 57,190 people.

References

Communes of Benin
Populated places in the Atlantique Department
Arrondissements of Benin